J. D. Smith may refer to:
J. D. Smith (fullback, born 1931), former American football fullback in the National Football League
J. D. Smith (fullback, born 1936), former American football fullback
J. D. Smith (offensive tackle) (born 1936), former American football offensive lineman in the National Football League
JD Smith, pseudonym used by Josh Seefried as the founder of OutServe
JD Smith, a member of Australian vocal group the Ten Tenors